North Dakota Highway 54 (ND 54) is a  east–west state highway in the U.S. state of North Dakota. ND 54's western terminus is at Interstate 29 (I-29) west of Oslo, Minnesota, and the eastern terminus is a continuation as Minnesota Highway 1 (MN 1) at the Minnesota border.

Route description
Highway 54 serves as a short east–west route in northeast North Dakota, connecting Interstate 29 to Minnesota Highway 1.  Highway 1 continues east to the cities of Oslo, Minnesota and Warren, Minnesota.

Major intersections

References

054
Transportation in Walsh County, North Dakota